Chabab Ghazieh Sporting Club, or simply Ghazieh, is a football club based in Ghazieh, Lebanon, that competes in the . Founded in 1961, the club plays their home matches at the Kfarjoz Stadium.

History 
On 11 April 2021, Chabab Ghazieh were relegated back to the Lebanese Second Division, finishing in 11th place in the 2020–21 Lebanese Premier League. They were crowned 2021–22 Lebanese Second Division champions, and were promoted back to the Premier League. The club finished the first half of the 2022-2023 Lebanese Premier League in the 6th place, thus accomplishing a historical place for the team as well as securing their place in the top tier for one extra year.

Club rivalries 
Ghazieh plays the South derby with Tadamon Sour, based on their location.

Players

Current squad

Honours 
 Lebanese Second Division
Winners (2): 2013–14 (Group A), 2021–22
 Lebanese Third Division
Winners (2): 1998–99, 2005–06

See also 
 List of football clubs in Lebanon

References

External links 

Chabab Ghazieh SC at LebanonFG

 
Football clubs in Lebanon
1960 establishments in Lebanon